Varillas is a surname. Notable people with the surname include:

Antoine Varillas (1624–1696), French historian
Gizmo Varillas (born 1990), Spanish songwriter, musician, and record producer
Juan Pablo Varillas (born 1995), Peruvian tennis player

See also
Varilla (disambiguation)